The Laval Associés were Laval's baseball team in the Ligue de Baseball Élite du Québec. They played at Montmorency Park in the Laval-des-Rapides neighbourhood.

In 2015, the team was replaced by the Pirates de Laval.

Former players
Jonathan Malo, New York Mets farm system

References

External links
 Team website

Baseball teams in Quebec
Sport in Laval, Quebec
1983 establishments in Quebec
Baseball teams established in 1983